Income Tax Sappy  is a 1954 short subject directed by Jules White starring the American slapstick comedy team The Three Stooges (Moe Howard, Larry Fine and Shemp Howard). It is the 153rd entry in the series released by Columbia Pictures starring the comedians, who released 190 shorts for the studio between 1934 and 1959.

Plot
The boys are set to do their income taxes, which are due the next day. As they do, Moe mentions how easy it is for people to cheat on their tax returns and not get caught, so the three get the idea to make fake deductions to ensure a hefty refund. Larry and Shemp come up with the further idea to make fake deductions for other peoples' tax returns and charge them for it. Moe finds this to be a great idea, and the three of them become "tax experts."

Sometime later, the Stooges are enjoying a life of luxury, having made much money from profits and their own tax returns. On one particular day, they host a dinner party for one of their clients; Mr. Cash a German who obsessively strokes his beard, but as the dinner commences, strange happenings and the Stooges' own incompetence anger their guest. He then removes his beard (which Larry had accidentally cut off), exposes himself as a sleeper agent for the IRS, and calls in his fellow agents to arrest the Stooges for tax fraud. With nothing left to lose, the boys make a mad dash and attempt to fight off the agents but, after some intervening slapstick, the boys surrender and it's off to jail for the stooges.

Cast

Credited
 Moe Howard as Moe
 Larry Fine as Larry
 Shemp Howard as Shemp
 Margie Liszt as Sis
 Benny Rubin as Mr. Cash
 Nanette Bordeaux as Mrs. Cash

Uncredited
 Frances Curry as Frances
 Vernon Dent as Internal Revenue Service Agent
 Joe Palma as Internal Revenue Service Agent

Production notes
The title Income Tax Sappy is a homonym for "Income Tax Happy."

This is one of only two shorts released in 1954 containing all new footage, the other being Shot in the Frontier. Shemp Howard did not slick down his long hair in either film. This was because he had begun dying his hair by this time, and initially could not use pomade.

Income Tax Sappy features a recurring gag of "Man Vs. Soup," wherein one of the Stooges is about to eat a soup that, at first unbeknownst to them, contains a live crustacean that continually eats all the crackers the Stooge drops in it, and a battle between the two parties ensues. In 1941's Dutiful But Dumb, Former Stooge Curly Howard tries to defeat a stubborn oyster in his stew; in 1948's Shivering Sherlocks, Moe is having problems with clam chowder; in this episode, Larry struggles against lobster gumbo.

References

External links 
 
 
Income Tax Sappy at threestooges.net

1954 films
1954 comedy films
The Three Stooges films
American black-and-white films
Films directed by Jules White
Columbia Pictures short films
1950s English-language films
American comedy short films
1950s American films